Rubuga is an administrative ward in Kigoma-Ujiji District of Kigoma Region in Tanzania. 
In 2016 the Tanzania National Bureau of Statistics report there were 2,899 people in the ward, from 2,634 in 2012.

Villages / neighborhoods 
The ward has 4 neighborhoods.
 Kipande
 Ndarabu
 Rubuga
 Wahombo

References

Wards of Kigoma Region